Damian O'Flynn (January 29, 1907 – August 8, 1982) was an Irish-American actor of film and television originally from Boston, Massachusetts.

Biography
 
O'Flynn made his screen debut in Marked Woman (1937), after which he was a freelance player for such studios as Warner Brothers, Paramount, and RKO Pictures. While serving in World War II, he was cast with several other actors-in-uniform in  Winged Victory, a production of 20th Century Fox. 
 
O'Flynn appeared in many western films and television series. He was cast with Ben Cooper in Gunfight at Comanche Creek (1963) and had a bit part in The Far Country (1954). He appeared in two secondary roles in sixty episodes of The Life and Legend of Wyatt Earp.

In addition to his work in westerns, O'Flynn guest-starred in two episodes of the CBS situation comedy Mr. Adams and Eve in 1957–1958.  He played a desk clerk in a 1969 Green Acres episode entitled "The Marital Vacation."

O'Flynn's acting career ended in 1969, and he died in 1982 in Los Angeles, California.

Selected filmography

 Marked Woman (1937) - Ralph Krawford
 Rage in Heaven (1941) - Bill - Steelworker #3 (uncredited)
 Lady Scarface (1941) - Lt. Onslow
 The Gay Falcon (1941) - Noel Weber
 The Great Man's Lady (1942) - Burns (uncredited)
 Broadway (1942) - Scar Edwards
 Powder Town (1942) - Oliver Lindsay
 Wake Island (1942) - Capt. Bill Patrick
 X Marks the Spot (1942) - Eddie Delaney
 Flight for Freedom (1943) - Pete (uncredited)
 Sarong Girl (1943) - Gil Gailord
 So Proudly We Hail! (1943) - Capt. Saunders (uncredited)
 Winged Victory (1944) - Col. Ross (uncredited)
 Miss Susie Slagle's (1946) - Dr. Benton (uncredited)
 Crack-Up (1946) - Stevenson
 The Bachelor's Daughters (1946) - Rex Miller
 The Devil on Wheels (1947) - John Clark
 The Beginning or the End (1947) - C.D. Howe
 Philo Vance Returns (1947) - Larry Blendon
 Saddle Pals (1947) - Bradford Collins
 Web of Danger (1947) - Bill O'Hara
 Devil Ship (1947) - Red Mason
 On Our Merry Way (1948) - Charlie Smallwood - Movie Director (uncredited)
 Half Past Midnight (1948) - Murray Evans
 A Foreign Affair (1948) - Lieutenant Colonel
 The Snake Pit (1948) - Mr. Stuart
 Disaster (1948) - Detective Dearborn
 Words and Music (1948) - Producer (uncredited)
 Riders of the Whistling Pines (1949) - Henchman Bill Wright
 Outpost in Morocco (1949) - Commandant Louis Fronval
 Black Midnight (1949) - Bill Jordan
 Pioneer Marshal (1949) - Bruce Burnett
 Young Daniel Boone (1950) - Capt. Fraser
 Bomba and the Hidden City (1950) - Dennis Johnson
 Mystery Submarine (1950) - Admiral (uncredited)
 Gambling House (1951) - Ralph Douglas
 You're in the Navy Now (1951) - Doctor (uncredited)
 Inside the Walls of Folsom Prison (1951) - Capt. Baxter (uncredited)
 Fighting Coast Guard (1951) - Captain Adair
 Yellow Fin (1951) - Capt. John Donovan
 Hoodlum Empire (1952) - Ralph Foster
 The Pride of St. Louis (1952) - Johnnie Bishop (uncredited)
 The Half-Breed (1952) - Captain Jackson
 Plymouth Adventure (1952) - Clarke (uncredited)
 Thunderbirds (1952) - Minor Role (uncredited)
 The Glenn Miller Story (1954) - Col. Baker (uncredited)
 The Miami Story (1954) - Police Chief Martin Belman
 The Far Country (1954) - Second Mate on Riverboat (uncredited)
 The Black Shield of Falworth (1954) - Sir Alexander (uncredited)
 Two Guns and a Badge (1954) - John Wilson - Banker
 Daddy Long Legs (1955) - Larry Hamilton (uncredited)
 One Desire (1955) - Fire Chief (uncredited)
 Teen-Age Crime Wave (1955) - Police Chief (uncredited)
 Hidden Guns (1956) - Kingsley
 D-Day the Sixth of June (1956) - Gen. Pike (uncredited)
 Drango (1957) - Gareth Blackford
 Apache Warrior (1957) - Major
 Teenage Doll (1957) - Harold Bonney (uncredited)
 Eighteen and Anxious (1957) - John Bayne
 Why Must I Die? (1960) - D.A. Walter Dennison
 Gunfight at Comanche Creek (1963) - Asa Winton (uncredited)
 Mirage (1965) - Bar Patron (uncredited)

References

External links

1907 births
1982 deaths
Male actors from Boston
American male film actors
American people of Irish descent
American male television actors
People from Los Angeles
American military personnel of World War II
20th-century American male actors